Dmitriy Viktorovich Dudarev (born 23 February 1976) is a Kazakh former professional ice hockey winger who notably played for Metallurg Novokuznetsk of the Kontinental Hockey League (KHL). He participated at the 2010 IIHF World Championship as a member of the Kazakhstan men's national ice hockey team.

Career statistics

Regular season and playoffs

International

References

External links

1976 births
Ak Bars Kazan players
Amur Khabarovsk players
Avangard Omsk players
HC Dynamo Moscow players
Metallurg Novokuznetsk players
HC MVD players
HC Sibir Novosibirsk players
Ice hockey players at the 1998 Winter Olympics
Ice hockey players at the 2006 Winter Olympics
Kazakhstani ice hockey right wingers
Kazakhstani people of Russian descent
Living people
Olympic ice hockey players of Kazakhstan
Sportspeople from Oskemen
Severstal Cherepovets players
Kazzinc-Torpedo players
Asian Games gold medalists for Kazakhstan
Medalists at the 1996 Asian Winter Games
Medalists at the 2011 Asian Winter Games
Asian Games medalists in ice hockey
Ice hockey players at the 1996 Asian Winter Games
Ice hockey players at the 2011 Asian Winter Games